Goryachev (from горячий meaning hot) is a Russian masculine surname, its feminine counterpart is Goryacheva. It may refer to
Anastasia Goryacheva, Russian ballerina 
Grisha Goryachev (born 1977), Russian guitarist
Ksenia Goryacheva (born 1996), Russian politician
Nikolay Goryachev (1883–1940), Russian astronomer
5075 Goryachev, a minor planet named after Nikolay
Svetlana Goryacheva (born 1947), Russian politician
Yelisey Goryachev (1892–1938), Soviet military officer
Yevgeni Goryachev (born 1992), Russian football player
Valentina Goryacheva (born 1935), wife of Yuri Gagarin

Russian-language surnames